Anti-Croat sentiment or Croatophobia is discrimination or prejudice against Croats as an ethnic group and it also consists of negative feelings towards Croatia as a country.

Nationalism in the 19th century 

With the nation-building process in the mid-19th century, the first Croatian-Serbian tensions emerged. Serbian minister Ilija Garašanin's Načertanije (1844) claimed lands that were inhabited by Bulgarians, Macedonians, Albanians, Montenegrins, Bosniaks, Hungarians and Croats were part of Serbia. Garašanin's plan also includes methods of spreading Serbian influence in the claimed lands. He proposed ways to influence Croats, who Garašanin regarded as "Serbs of Catholic faith". Serbian Orthodox Church also played a vital role in promoting such ideas, with bishop Nikodim Milaš publishing influential work Pravoslavna Dalmacija (1901) claiming that the Croatian historical lands and historical-sacral heritage were Serbian since Early Middle Ages among others.

Vuk Karadžić and other early Slavists considered everyone speaking Shtokavian dialects to be ethnic Serbs. Hence, the literary and standard Croatian language and heritage, based on Shtokavian, was to be a part of the Serbian language, and all Shtokavian-speaking Croats were counted as "Catholic Serbs". Chakavian was considered to be the only and original Croatian language, sometimes also Kajkavian which was theoretically related to the Slovenes, and sometimes none dialect (grouping Chakavian with Shtokavian as Serbian language), reducing Croats to merely a toponym. Croatia was at the time a kingdom in the Habsburg monarchy, with Dalmatia and Istria being separate Habsburg crown lands. Ante Starčević, head of the Croatian Party of Rights, advocated for Croatia as a nation.

After Austria-Hungary occupied Bosnia and Herzegovina in 1878 and Serbia gained its independence from the Ottoman Empire, Croatian and Serbian relations deteriorated as both sides had pretensions on Bosnia and Herzegovina. In 1902, there was a reprinted article written by the Serb Nikola Stojanović that was published in the publication of the Serb Independent Party from Zagreb titled Do istrage vaše ili naše (Till the Destruction, Ours or Yours). The article denied the existence of a Croat nation, and forecast the result of the "inevitable" Serbian-Croatian conflict.

During the 19th century, some Italian radical nationalists tried to promote the idea that the Croatian nation has no sound reason to exist: therefore the Slavic population on the east coast of the Adriatic Sea (Croats and Slovenes) should be Italianized, and the territory be included in Italy.

World War II

Fascist Italy

Fascist-led Italianization, or the forced assimilation of Italian culture on the ethnic Croat communities inhabiting the former Austro-Hungarian territories of the Julian March and areas of Dalmatia, as well as ethnically-mixed cities in Italy proper, such as Trieste, had already been initiated prior to World War II. The Anti-Slavic sentiment, perpetuated by Italian fascism, led to the persecution of Croats, alongside ethnic Slovenes, on ethnic and cultural grounds.

In September 1920, Mussolini said: 

This period of fascist Italianization included the banning of the Croatian language in administration and courts between 1923 and 1925, the Italianization of Croat first and last names in 1926 and the dissolution of Croatian societies, financial co-operatives and banks. Hundreds of Croatian-speaking schools were closed by the state.

Between February and April 1921, Croats in Istria became victims of Italian Fascist terror during the period of Fascist and anti-Fascist violence in Italy.  In response to the Proština rebellion, led by Croat Anti-fascists and local peasants, hundreds of Italian Squadrismo militia, Black Shirts, as well as members of the local army and police, attacked the Croat villages of Proština, Krnica, Marčana and Šegotići, in order to intimidate the Croat population. The Fascists burned Šegotići completely to the ground, while houses in the other villages were also burned. 400 peasants were arrested and imprisoned in Pula, several peasants died after being beaten to death.

This period was therefore characterised as "centralising, oppressive and dedicated to the forcible Italianisation of the minorities" consequently leading to a strong emigration and assimilations of Slovenes and Croats from the Julian March.

Following the Axis invasion of Yugoslavia in April 1941, Italy occupied almost all of Dalmatia, as well as Gorski Kotar and the Italian government made stringent efforts to further Italianize the region. Italian occupying forces were accused of committing war crimes in order to transform occupied territories into ethnic Italian territories. An example of this was the 1942 massacre in Podhum, when Italian forces murdered up to 118 Croat civilians and deported the remaining population to concentration camps.

The Italian government operated concentration camps for tens of thousands Slavic citizens, such as Rab concentration camp and one on the island of Molat, where thousands died, including hundreds of children.

Nazi Germany

Nazi German racial theories towards the Croats was inconsistent and contradictory. On the one hand, the Nazis described the Croats officially as being "more Germanic than Slav", a notion made by Croatia's fascist dictator Ante Pavelić who imposed the view that the "Croatians were the descendants of the ancient Goths" who "had the Panslav idea forced upon them as something artificial".

However, the Nazi regime continued to classify the Croats as Untermensch, despite its alliance with them.

Furthermore, according to the book "Hitler's Table Talk", a collection of monologues by Adolf Hitler and conversations he had with close associates in the period from 1941 to 1944, Hitler mentioned that Croats should eventually become Germanized.

According to Jozo Tomasevich, the Independent State of Croatia (NDH), was one of a few countries that Hitler called "Dreckstaaten", or "turd states", that would need to be "reorganised" after the German victory.

After the Anschluss of 1938, Austrian Burgenland Croats faced Germanization and were forced by the Nazi regime to assimilate. Minority rights that had been approved in 1937, such as Croatian language schools and bilingualism, were abolished under Nazi rule.

Between 1941 and 1945, some 200,000 Croatian citizens of the NDH (including ethnic Croats as well as ethnic Serbs with Croatian nationality and Slovenes) were sent to Germany to work as slave and forced labourers, mostly working in mining, agriculture and forestry. It is estimated that 153,000 of these labourers were said to have been "voluntarily" recruited, however in many instances this was not the case, as the workers that may have initially volunteered were forced to work longer hours and were paid less than their contracts had stipulated, they were also not allowed to return home after their yearly contract had ended, at which point their labour was no longer voluntary, but forced. Forced and slave labour were also conducted in Nazi concentration camps, such as in Buchenwald and Mittelbau-Dora.

From 1941 to 1945, 3.8% of the population of Croatia had been sent to the Reich to work, which was higher than the European average.

Chetniks

Regarding the realization of his Greater Serbian program Homogeneous Serbia, Stevan Moljević wrote in his letter to Dragiša Vasić in February 1942:

The tactics employed against the Croats were at least to an extent, a reaction to the terror carried out by the Ustashas, but Croats and Muslims living in areas intended to be part of Greater Serbia were to be cleansed of non-Serbs regardless, in accordance with Draža Mihailović's directive of 20 December 1941. However the largest Chetnik massacres took place in eastern Bosnia where they preceded any significant Ustasha operations. Chetnik ethnic cleansing targeted Croat civilians throughout areas of Croatia and Bosnia and Herzegovina, in which Croats were massacred and expelled, such as the Krnjeuša massacre and the Gata massacre, among many others. According to the Croatian historian, Vladimir Žerjavić, Chetnik forces killed between 18,000–32,000 Croats during World War II, mostly civilians. Some historians regard Chetnik actions during this period as constituting genocide.

Written evidence by Chetnik commanders indicates that terrorism against the non-Serb population was mainly intended to establish an ethnically pure Greater Serbia in the historical territory of other ethnic groups (most notably Croatian and Muslim, but also Bulgarian, Romanian, Hungarian, Macedonian and Montenegrin). In Elaborate of the Chetnik's Dinaric Battalion from March 1942, it's stated that the Chetniks' main goal was to create a "Serbian national state in the areas in which the Serbs live, and even those to which Serbs aspire (Bosnia and Herzegovina, Lika and part of Dalmatia) where "only Orthodox population would live". It is also stated that Bosniaks should be convinced that Serbs are their allies, so they wouldn't join the Partisans, and then kill them."

Regarding the campaign, Chetnik commander Milan Šantić said in Trebinje in July 1942, "The Serb lands must be cleansed from Catholics and Muslims. They will be inhabited only by the Serbs. Cleansing will be carried out thoroughly, and we will suppress and destroy them all without exception and without pity, which will be the starting point for our liberation. Mihailović went further than Moljević and requested over 90 percent of the NDH's territory, where more than 2,500,000 Catholics and over 800,000 Muslims lived (70 percent of the total population, with Orthodox Serbs the remaining 30 percent). 

According to Bajo Stanišić, the final goal of the Chetniks was the "founding of a new Serbian state, not a geographical term but a purely Serbian, with four basic attributes: the Serbian state [Greater Serbia], the Serb King [of] the Karađorđević dynasty, Serbian nationality, and Serbian faith. The Balkan federation is also the next stage, but the main axis and leadership of this federation must be our Serbian state, that is, the Greater Serbia.

Yugoslav Wars

After Serbian President Slobodan Milošević's assumption of power in 1989, various Chetnik groups made a "comeback" and his regime "made a decisive contribution to launching the Chetnik insurrection in 1990–1992 and to funding it thereafter," according to the political scientist Sabrina P. Ramet. Chetnik ideology was influenced by the memorandum of the Serbian Academy of Sciences and Arts. Serbs in north Dalmatia, Knin, Obrovac, and Benkovac held the first anti-Croatian government demonstrations. On 28 June 1989, the 600th anniversary of the Battle of Kosovo, exiled Croatian Serb Chetnik commander Momčilo Đujić bestowed the Serbian politician Vojislav Šešelj with the title of voivode, encouraging him to "expel all Croats, Albanians, and other foreign elements from holy Serbian soil", stating he would return to the Balkans only when Serbia was cleansed of "the last Jew, Albanian, and Croat".

Šešelj is a major proponent of a Greater Serbia with no ethnic minorities, but "ethnic unity and harmony among Orthodox Serbs, Catholic Serbs, Muslim Serbs and atheist Serbs". In late 1991, during the Battle of Vukovar, Šešelj went to Borovo Selo to meet with a Serbian Orthodox Church bishop and publicly described Croats as a genocidal and perverted people. In May and July 1992, Šešelj visited the Vojvodinian village of Hrtkovci and publicly started the campaign of persecution of local ethnic Croats.

16,000 Croats were killed during the Croatian War of Independence, 43.4% of whom were civilians, largely through massacres and bombings that occurred during the war.  The total number of expelled Croats and other non-Serbs during the Croatian War of Independence ranges from 170,000 (ICTY), 250,000 (Human Rights Watch) or 500,000 (UNHCR). Croatian Serbs forces together with Yugoslav People's Army and Serbian nationalist paramilitaries committed numerous war crimes against Croat civilians.

According to the Croatian Association of Prisoners in Serbian Concentration Camps, a total of 8,000 Croatian civilians and prisoners of war (a large number after the fall of Vukovar) went through Serb prison camps such as Sremska Mitrovica camp, Stajićevo camp, Niš camp and many others where many were heavily abused and tortured. A total of 300 people never returned from them. A total of 4,570 camp inmates started legal action against former Serbia and Montenegro (now Serbia) for torture and abuse in the camps. Croatia regained control over most of the territories occupied by the Croatian Serb rebels in 1995.

War crimes and acts of ethnic cleansing were also committed by the Bosnian Serb and Muslim (Bosniak) armies against Bosnian Croat civilians, during the Bosnian War, from 1992-1995. 490,000 Bosnian Croats (or 67% of the population) became displaced during the conflict. In the Serb-controlled Republika Srpska entity, the population of Croats in 2011, has decreased by 8.1% since 1991, mostly as a result of war.

21st century
Croats were recognised in Serbia as a minority group just after 2002. According to some estimates, the number of Croats who left Serbia under political pressure from the Milošević government may have been between 20,000 and 40,000. According to Tomislav Žigmanov, Croats live in fear as they have become the most hated minority group in Serbia. The Government of Croatia contends that anti-Croat sentiment is still prevalent in Serbia.

In October 2021, a local Croatian-language weekly newspaper in Serbia's Vojvodina region, Hrvatska riječ, reported that a grammar book for eighth-grade pupils stated that the Serbian, Slovenian, Macedonian and Bulgarian languages are South Slavic languages while "Croats, Bosniaks and some Montenegrins call the Serbian language Croatian, Bosnian, Bosniak or Montenegrin".

The textbook was approved by the Serbian Institute for the Improvement of Education, a state education institution.

The wording of the Serbian textbook has been criticised by the Institute of Croatian Language and Linguistics, by Žigmanov, president of the Democratic Alliance of Croats in Vojvodina, and by Jasna Vojnić, president of the Croatian National Council in Serbia, an organisation which represents the interests of the Croat minority in the country.

Destruction of cultural heritage 
In 1891, Croatian archeologist Lujo Marun found a sarcophagus of 9th century Croatian duke in a village Biskupija near Knin. These remains were later indentified to most likely belong to Branimir of Croatia. On the next day, the local Orthodox Serbs repordetly re-opened the grave and vandalized the remains. In 1983, someone vandalized 9th century Croatian pre-Romanesque Church of Holy Salvation in Cetina by destroying Croatian interlace ornaments on it, in order to remove the proof if its old-Croatian origin.

Pejorative terms for Croats

Ustasha: Derogatory slur used primarily by Serbian nationalists in reference to the Independent State of Croatia and the fascist Ustasha movement during World War II in Yugoslavia.
Wog (Australia): In Australian English, the slur "wog" is used to refer to immigrants of Southern European, Mediterranean, Middle Eastern, and sometimes Eastern European ethnicity or appearance, and has thus also been applied to ethnic Croat immigrants.

See also
 Anti-Catholicism
 Anti-Slavic sentiment

References

Sources

External links
 "The U.S. Media and Yugoslavia, 1991-1995" (book), James J. Sadkovich, Greenwood Publishing Group, 1998.

 
Foreign relations of Croatia
Anti-Slavic sentiment
Croat